Kazimierz Jarochowski (1828–1888) was a Polish historian, publicist of the Dziennik Poznański (Poznań Daily), co-founder of PTPN.

References

Polish male non-fiction writers
People from the Grand Duchy of Posen
Members of the Prussian House of Representatives
1828 births
1888 deaths
19th-century Polish historians
Member of the Tomasz Zan Society